Jack Gallagher may refer to:
 Jack Gallagher (comedian) (born 1953), American comedian, actor and writer
 Jack Gallagher (composer) (born 1947), American composer and college professor
 Jack Gallagher (historian) (1919–1980), British historian
 Jack Gallagher (oilman) (1916–1998), Canadian oil and gas executive
 Gentleman Jack Gallagher (born 1990), British professional wrestler
 Jack Gallagher, character in And Millions Will Die

See also
 Jackie Gallagher (disambiguation)
 John Gallagher (disambiguation)